The Midnight Girl is a 1925 American drama film directed by Wilfred Noy and starring Lila Lee and featuring Béla Lugosi.

Plot
Lugosi plays, according to an intertitle, "Nicholas Harmon, the immensely wealthy patron of music" who "loved his weaknesses — and his favorite weakness was Nina," his mistress, an opera singer whose voice is faltering. His stepson Don, an orchestra conductor, rejects the attentions of a society girl. Don becomes estranged from his stepfather in an argument, and leaves to succeed on his own. He helps the career of Anna, a newly arrived singer from Russia who becomes a nightclub star, the "Midnight Girl". Harmon sees her perform, and is entranced. He invites her to his apartment, where his attempts to seduce her become forceful. Anna fires at gun at him, but hits instead Nina, who has been hiding behind a curtain. Harmon realizes how much he loves Nina, and cradles her in his arms. At the end of the story, Don has married Anna, who is now a leading opera singer, and Harmon has married Nina.

Cast

Production
The film was adapted from a story by Garrett Fort, who would later co-write the screenplay for Lugosi's Dracula. It was filmed in early 1925 at the Astoria Studios, on Long Island, New York.

In 1926, opera singer Nina Morgana sued Chadwick Pictures over The Midnight Girl, claiming that the opera singer character in named "Nina" is portrayed as "debauched" and "passe", and thus was damaging to Morgana's reputation.

Preservation
A print of the film survives.

See also
 Béla Lugosi filmography

References

External links

1925 films
1925 drama films
Silent American drama films
American silent feature films
American black-and-white films
1920s English-language films
Films directed by Wilfred Noy
Films shot at Astoria Studios
1920s American films